The prostatic urethra,  the widest and most dilatable part of the urethra canal, is about 3 cm long.

It runs almost vertically through the prostate from its base to its apex, lying nearer its anterior than its posterior surface; the form of the canal is spindle-shaped, being wider in the middle than at either extremity, and narrowest below, where it joins the membranous portion.

A transverse section of the canal as it lies in the prostate is horse-shoe-shaped, with the convexity directed forward.

The keyhole sign, in ultrasound, is associated with a dilated bladder and prostatic urethra.

Additional images

References

External links
 
 
  - "The Male Pelvis: The Prostate Gland"
 Chronic Prostatitis - Four Major Symptoms and Three Lifestyle To Follow

Prostate
Male urethra